Alaa Al Hejji (born 3 December 1995) is a football player for Al-Wehda in the Saudi Professional League.

References

External links 
 

1995 births
Living people
People from Qatif
Saudi Arabian footballers
Saudi First Division League players
Saudi Professional League players
Khaleej FC players
Al-Wehda Club (Mecca) players
Association football midfielders
Saudi Arabian Shia Muslims